Rodney Goddard Aller (October 24, 1916 – March 21, 2005) was an American lawyer, naval officer and masters skier.

He won several medals in masters skiing, including four gold medals in World Championship Masters Skiing in 2002 in Abetone, Italy. He died of pneumonia in 2005.

Aller graduated from Princeton University in 1938, earned a law degree from Yale Law School and served in the United States Navy during World War II.

References

Bibliography
"Aller, 85, Boasts Four Gold Medals in World Championship Masters Skiing" by Cynthia Hochswender, Staff Reporter, Lakeville Journal (Ct.), May 2002" reproduced at Rodney Goddard Aller (October 24, 1916 - March 21, 2005)
Rod Aller Memorial
Princeton Alumni Weekly - Memorials - Rodney Goddard Aller '38

Princeton University alumni
Yale Law School alumni
20th-century American lawyers
1916 births
2005 deaths
American male alpine skiers
Deaths from pneumonia in the United States
United States Navy personnel of World War II
United States Navy officers